Jakub Kawa (born October 1, 1988 in Poland) is a Polish footballer who played as a midfielder.

Jakub Kawa made his Ekstraklasa debut in December 2008 against ŁKS Łódź, substituting Ben Starosta.

External links 
 

1988 births
Living people
Lechia Gdańsk players
Polish footballers
Bałtyk Gdynia players
Znicz Pruszków players
People from Morąg
Sportspeople from Warmian-Masurian Voivodeship
Association footballers not categorized by position